"Twist My Arm" is the third single from The Tragically Hip's second full-length studio album, Road Apples.

The single's B-side is a live version of the song "Highway Girl" from the band's debut EP, in which Gord Downie tells the story of a suicide pact between a man and his girlfriend. It was a hit on Canadian radio, allowing the song to chart considerably higher than in its original form, and contains some lines which would later recur as lyrics in the band's 1992 single "Locked in the Trunk of a Car".

Charts

References

1991 singles
The Tragically Hip songs
1991 songs
MCA Records singles